Hans Olsson (born June 10, 1951) is a Swedish politician of the Social Democratic Party. He has been a member of the Riksdag since 2006.

External links
Riksdagen: Hans Olsson (s)

1951 births
Living people
Members of the Riksdag from the Social Democrats
Members of the Riksdag 2006–2010
Place of birth missing (living people)
21st-century Swedish politicians
Members of the Riksdag 2010–2014